The Paris Convention on Third Party Liability in the Field of Nuclear Energy is a 1960 OECD Convention on liability and compensation for damage caused by accidents occurring while producing nuclear energy. The convention entered into force on 1 April 1968 and has been amended by protocols in 1964, 1982, and 2004. The convention, as amended by the 1964 and 1982 protocols have 16 parties. The 2004 protocol has not entered into force. Austria and Luxembourg signed the convention but have not ratified it. Switzerland deposited its instruments of ratification for the convention as amended by the 2004 protocol. The convention will entered into force for this country when the 2004 protocol entered into force in 2022.

The convention:
 Limits liability to a certain amount and limit the period for making claims;
 Require insurance or other surety by operators;
 Channels liability exclusively to the operator of the nuclear installation;
 Impose strict liability on the nuclear operator, regardless of fault, but subject to exceptions.
 Grants exclusive jurisdiction to the courts of one country, normally the country in whose territory the incident occurs

Parties
A list of Parties to the convention (as amended by the 1964 and 1982 protocols), the 2004 protocol, as well as the Brussels protocol and the Joint protocol is shown below:

Notes

See also
Vienna Convention on Civil Liability for Nuclear Damage
Cost of electricity by source

References

External links
"Paris Convention on Nuclear Third Party Liability", oecd-nea.org.
Text.
Ratifications.
NEA Issue Brief: International nuclear third party liability, An analysis of principal nuclear issues, No. 4 - 1st revision, November 1993.

Nuclear liability
Energy treaties
1960 in France
Treaties concluded in 1960
Treaties entered into force in 1968
Treaties of Belgium
Treaties of Denmark
Treaties of Finland
Treaties of France
Treaties of West Germany
Treaties of the Kingdom of Greece
Treaties of Italy
Treaties of the Netherlands
Treaties of Norway
Treaties of Portugal
Treaties of Slovenia
Treaties of Francoist Spain
Treaties of Sweden
Treaties of Switzerland
Treaties of Turkey
Treaties of the United Kingdom
Nuclear technology treaties
Treaties extended to Greenland
Treaties extended to the British Virgin Islands
Treaties extended to the Cayman Islands
Treaties extended to the Falkland Islands
Treaties extended to Gibraltar
Treaties extended to Guernsey
Treaties extended to Jersey
Treaties extended to the Isle of Man
Treaties extended to Montserrat
Treaties extended to Saint Helena, Ascension and Tristan da Cunha
OECD treaties
Liability treaties
Treaties extended to Clipperton Island
Treaties extended to French Comoros
Treaties extended to French Somaliland
Treaties extended to French Guiana
Treaties extended to French Polynesia
Treaties extended to the French Southern and Antarctic Lands
Treaties extended to Guadeloupe
Treaties extended to Martinique
Treaties extended to Mayotte
Treaties extended to Réunion
Treaties extended to New Caledonia
Treaties extended to Saint Pierre and Miquelon
Treaties extended to Wallis and Futuna
Treaties extended to the Colony of the Bahamas
Treaties extended to British Hong Kong
Treaties extended to the Gilbert and Ellice Islands
Treaties extended to the British Solomon Islands